Stroud is a surname. Notable people with the surname include:

Barry Stroud (1935–2019), American philosopher
Byron Stroud (born 1969), Canadian musician
Carlos Stroud (born 1942), American physicist
C. J. Stroud (born 2001), American football player
David Stroud (born 1987), British footballer
Derek Stroud (1930–2015), English footballer
Don Stroud (born 1943), American actor
Donna Stroud (born 1964), American lawyer and jurist
Gregory Stroud (1892–1974), English operatic singer in Australia
John Stroud (born 1957), American basketball player
John Stroud (director) (1955–2009), British television director and producer
Jonathan Stroud, author of the Bartimaeus Trilogy
Ken Stroud (1908–2000), author of mathematics textbooks
Kenny Stroud, British footballer
Les Stroud, Canadian television survival enthusiast
Marcus Stroud (born 1978), American football player
Marion Boulton Stroud (1939–2015), American curator, author, and museum director
Mike Stroud (disambiguation), several people with this name
Mike Stroud (physician) (born 1955), British physician and explorer
Mike Stroud (musician), guitarist in the New York electronic rock duo Ratatat
Morris Stroud (1946–2016), American football player
Peter Stroud, American guitarist
Philippa Stroud, Baroness Stroud, (born 1965) British think tanker
Reuben W. Stroud (1841–1875), New York engineer and politician
Rhonda Stroud (born 1971), American materials scientist and planetary scientist
Robert Stroud (1890–1963), murderer, author, and subject of the book and film "Birdman of Alcatraz"
Ronald S. Stroud (1933–2021), Canadian historian, academic, archeologist, and epigraphist.

Surnames
English toponymic surnames
English-language surnames
Surnames of English origin
Surnames of British Isles origin